Santa Teresa Club Deportivo, formerly Badajoz Club de Fútbol and Deportivo Pacense, is a football club based in Badajoz in the autonomous community of Extremadura, Spain. Founded in 2006, it plays in Tercera División - Group 14.

History
Unión Deportiva Badajoz was founded in 2006 and Badajoz CF in the summer of 2012.
The current club was founded in summer 2013 after the merger of Badajoz CF, UD Badajoz and CD Puerta Palmas.

In July 2014, the club changed its name to Deportivo Pacense. In July 2017, the club merged with Santa Teresa CD, a women's football club, and changed to the latter name.

Season to season
 As UD Badajoz

 As Badajoz CF

 As Deportivo Pacense

 As Santa Teresa CD

8 seasons in Tercera División

See also
Santa Teresa CD (women), women's football team

References

External links
Official website 
Unofficial website 
Fexfutbol profile
Futbolme team profile 

 
Football clubs in Extremadura
Association football clubs established in 2006
2006 establishments in Spain
Sport in Badajoz
Football clubs in Spain